Xieite is an iron chromium oxide mineral with formula Fe2+Cr2O4. It is a member of the spinel group and a high pressure polymorph of chromite.

It was discovered in samples taken from the Suizhou meteorite which fell in 1986 in the Zengdu District of China.

References

Oxide minerals
Meteorite minerals
Orthorhombic minerals
Minerals in space group 63
Spinel group